The High Energy Projectile Factory (HEPF) is an artillery ammunition factory operated by Munitions India Limited. It was previously part the erstwhile Ordnance Factories Board of the Government of India the factory is located about 25 kilometres from the main city of Tiruchirappalli.

History
The factory was initially established in the late 1980s as a unit of Defence Research and Development Organisation in collaboration with other government defence agencies and some foreign partners. After full scale development of the product was completed, the factory was handed over to Ordnance Factories Board, to begin full-scale production. This is one of the forty one ordnance factories operated by OFB throughout India, and one of the two factories in Tiruchirappalli, the other being Ordnance Factory Tiruchirappalli (OFT). After dismantling of Ordnance Factory Board the High energy Projectile Factory become part of newly formed DPSU Munitions India Limited.

Products

The factory produces 400 tonne per annum home-made tungsten based heavy alloy components through powder metallurgy processes to manufacture FSAPDS (Fin Stabilized Armor Piercing Discarding Sabot), alternatively called the APFSDS, which is a high kinetic energy weapon used in tank and other armor-piercing ammunition, supplied to Indian Army.

Geography
The project factory is set up separately from the township that houses the employees working in the project. The township is a part of the project and is adequately equipped for meeting the daily needs of its residents. There are government quarters for the employees, a small dispensary-cum-hospital, banks and post-office. There are two schools, one of them being a Kendriya Vidyalaya (Central School). There is a small market complex that houses a few shops selling groceries, stationery shops, PCO among others.

The place is surrounded by a few small villages and settlements. It is also connected by road to its sister factory OFT, which is a couple of kilometres away and  BHEL (Bharat Heavy Electricals Limited) is located about 5 kilometres away. There are buses connecting the township to the main town and a few auto-rickshaws also ply between the places.

References

Economy of Tiruchirappalli
Defence companies of India
Ministry of Defence (India)
Companies based in Kolkata
1980s establishments in West Bengal